Wang Yumei (28 October 1934 – 13 April 2022) was a Chinese actress who has won a Golden Eagle Award, a Golden Rooster Award and a Hundred Flowers Award.

Filmography

Films

Television

References

External links

1934 births
2022 deaths
Actresses from Jinan
20th-century Chinese actresses
21st-century Chinese actresses
Chinese film actresses
Chinese television actresses